Mohammed Abacha is the eldest surviving son of Nigeria's former military ruler, the late general Sani Abacha, and his wife Maryam Abacha.

Money laundering
During his father's military rule, Mohammed Abacha was involved in looting the government.
A preliminary report published by the Abdulsalam Abubakar transitional government in November 1998 described the process. Sani Abacha told his National Security Adviser Ismaila Gwarzo to provide fake funding requests, which Abacha approved. The funds were usually sent in cash or travellers' cheques by the Central Bank of Nigeria to Gwarzo Kuncnoni, who took them to Abacha's house. Mohammed Abacha then arranged to launder the money to offshore accounts.
An estimated $1.4 billion in cash was delivered in this way.

Legacy
Like his father and mother, Mohammed Abacha has been referenced in 419 scams.

References

External links
 Abacha loot trial: Swiss bid to take evidence aborted

Nigerian fraudsters
Year of birth missing (living people)
Living people
20th-century births
Children of national leaders
Mohammed
Money launderers